Sanjay Gill (born 29 June 1975) is an Indian former cricketer. He played first-class cricket for Delhi and Rajasthan between 1999 and 2006. Ahead of the start of the 2006–07 Ranji Trophy, he was named as the player to watch in Rajasthan's squad.

See also
 List of Delhi cricketers

References

External links
 

1975 births
Living people
Indian cricketers
Delhi cricketers
Rajasthan cricketers
Cricketers from Delhi